Sir Jack Petchey  (born 19 July 1925) is an English businessman and philanthropist.

Early life
He was born on 19 July 1925 in Plaistow, Essex. He came from a working-class family and was brought up in the East End of London, leaving school aged 13.

During the Second World War, he served in the Royal Navy.

Career
Petchey started a car hire and car sales business. From his profits he invested in property and timeshare which grew into a business empire valued over half a billion pounds by 2007. Jack became known as the grandfather of timeshare, and amassed his fortune with marketing in UK and abroad. It was the resort in Albufeira, Portugal, where the real timeshare boom took place, right up to late 2000s, when the whole conglomerate of leisure businesses was sold. In 1969, he was involved with property development,  becoming one of the most successful businessmen in Britain.

Petchey involvement in football first came when he was appointed a director of West Ham United in 1978. He then went on to own Watford Football Club which he bought from Elton John in 1987. He resigned as chairman in March 1994 and sold the club back to the singer.

Philanthropy
The Jack Petchey Foundation's flagship programme is its Achievement Award scheme – a reward and recognition initiative which enables schools and youth organisations to celebrate the achievements of their young people as well as receive additional funding.  Almost 2,000 schools, colleges and youth organisations across London and Essex run the scheme, which contributes millions of pounds each year. Among the organisations on the scheme are sports, music and performing arts clubs, uniformed and disability groups, and youth clubs.

The foundation also celebrates Adult Leaders who support young people and has funding available for educational visits and for young volunteers to carry out projects both in the UK and abroad. On top of the central grant giving programmes, the Jack Petchey Foundation runs a number of partnership programmes including the Jack Petchey Speak Out Challenge, Step Into Dance, Panathlon, the London Schools Table Tennis Championships and the Anthony Nolan Register and Be a Lifesaver programme. The foundation was also the central funding body of the Petchey Academy and the Petchey Centre for Entrepreneurship. The Foundation also has a branch in Albufeira, Portugal, which does similar work to its British counterpart.

Petchey was nominated as a Scouting In London Ambassador for the Scout Association Region for Greater London at an Adult Appreciation ceremony in 2008.

As of May 2017, he is worth an estimated £550 million.

Honours
Petchey was appointed Officer of the Order of the British Empire (OBE) in 2004 and Commander of the Order of the British Empire (CBE) in the 2011 Birthday Honours for charitable services. He was knighted in the 2016 New Year Honours for services to young people in East London and Essex through the Jack Petchey Foundation.

On 27 May 2010, he was given the Freedom of the Borough of Newham.

He has also been made a Honorary Commodore in the Sea Cadet Corps.

Personal life
Petchey was married twice. He first married Diane Harrison in 1949, they had a son, John, and three daughters, Jackie, Susan and Amanda. In 2016 at the age of 90 he married a second time to Frances Segelman, a sculptor.

References

1925 births
Living people
People from Plaistow, Newham
Watford F.C. directors
Commanders of the Order of the British Empire
Knights Bachelor
West Ham United F.C. directors and chairmen
Royal Navy sailors
Royal Navy personnel of World War II
English philanthropists